The Nathaniel Page House is a historic colonial First Period house in Bedford, Massachusetts. It was originally thought to date from 1687, but an investigation conducted by the "This Old House" television program placed the actual date of construction at about 1720.  The house is a -story wood-frame structure, five bays wide, with a side-gable roof, clapboard siding, and a central chimney.  A single-story ell extends to the left side of the main block.

The house was listed on the National Register of Historic Places in 1978.

See also
List of the oldest buildings in Massachusetts
National Register of Historic Places listings in Middlesex County, Massachusetts

References

Houses completed in 1687
Houses on the National Register of Historic Places in Middlesex County, Massachusetts
Houses in Bedford, Massachusetts
1687 establishments in Massachusetts